The French Tête nucléaire aéroportée - Airborne nuclear warhead (TNA) is a thermonuclear warhead carried by the Air-Sol Moyenne Portée Amélioré (ASMPA) medium-range air-to-surface missile, a component of the Force de frappe French nuclear deterrent. The warhead was introduced in 2010. 54 warheads had been produced replacing former TN 81 warhead carried by former Air-sol moyenne portée (ASMP) medium-range air-to-surface missile.

Deployment: 54 warheads carried by the ASMPA equipping the Mirage 2000 N with the French Air Force and Dassault Rafale of Naval Aviation. The airborne nuclear warheads (TNA) that are carried on the new improved medium-range air-to-ground missiles (in French ASMPA) are now loaded underneath the Rafale aircraft. Each TNA has a yield of 300 kilotonnes.

Specifications: 
 thermonuclear weapon
 Yield from 100 to 300 kiloton 
 insensitive explosives

References

Nuclear warheads of France
Military equipment introduced in the 2010s